Stephen K. Streiffer (born 6 January 1966) is an American engineer from the Argonne National Laboratory. He attended Rice University and received his PhD from Stanford University. He was awarded the status of Fellow in the American Physical Society, after they were nominated by their Division of Materials Physics in 2007, for "experimental studies of ferroelectric thin film physics, that have established the relationships between epitaxial strain, ferroelectric phase transition behavior and domain structure, and size effects, and for advancing the fundamental understanding of complex oxide thin film microstructure." In 2022 he was named as Stanford University’s vice president for SLAC National Accelerator Laboratory. During the search to replace the director of SLAC National Accelerator Laboratory he was appointed to the role of interim lab director in 2023.

References 

Living people
1966 births
People from Baton Rouge, Louisiana
Stanford University School of Engineering alumni
Rice University alumni
Fellows of the American Physical Society
American Physical Society
American physicists